The Help Defeat Cancer project ran on World Community Grid from July 20, 2006 to April 2007. It sought to improve the ability of medical professionals to determine the best treatment options for patients with cancers of the breast, head, or neck. The project worked by identifying visual patterns in large numbers of tissue microarrays taken from archived tissue samples. By correlating the pattern data with information about treatment and patient outcome, the results of this project could help provide better targeted treatment options.

References

External links 
 World Community Grid - Research - Help Defeat Cancer

Berkeley Open Infrastructure for Network Computing projects
Volunteer computing projects
Cancer research